The 2016 French Open described below in detail, in the form of day-by-day summaries.

Day 1 (22 May)
Some matches scheduled for Sunday were postponed due to rain, but half of the  planned matches were completed before the rain started.
Schedule of play

Day 2 (23 May)
Play was supposed to start at 11:00 am CEST, but rain continued, and matches did not  begin until 1:30 pm CEST.
Schedule of play
Seeds out:
Men's Singles:  Marin Čilić [10],  Steve Johnson [33]
Women's Singles:  Roberta Vinci [7],  Sara Errani [16],  Karolína Plíšková [17],  Jeļena Ostapenko [32]

Day 3 (24 May)
Angelique Kerber became just the fifth woman to win the Australian Open, then lose in the opening round at Roland Garros in the same year.

Schedule of play
Seeds out:
Men's Singles:  Kevin Anderson [18],  Philipp Kohlschreiber [24],  Federico Delbonis [31],  Fabio Fognini [32]
Women's Singles:  Angelique Kerber [3],  Victoria Azarenka [5],  Johanna Konta [20],  Jelena Janković [23],  Monica Niculescu [31]

Day 4 (25 May)
Schedule of play
Seeds out:
Men's Singles:  Benoît Paire [19],  Lucas Pouille [29]
Women's Singles:  Ekaterina Makarova [27]
Men's Doubles:  Juan Sebastián Cabal /  Robert Farah [13]
Women's Doubles:  Anabel Medina Garrigues /  Arantxa Parra Santonja [13]

Day 5 (26 May)
Schedule of play
Seeds out:
Men's Singles:  Bernard Tomic [20],  João Sousa [26]
Women's Singles:  Andrea Petkovic [28]
Men's Doubles:  Raven Klaasen /  Rajeev Ram [8]
Women's Doubles:  Bethanie Mattek-Sands /  Lucie Šafářová [2],  Lara Arruabarrena /  Sara Errani [12],  Vania King /  Alla Kudryavtseva [15],  Chuang Chia-jung /  Hsieh Su-wei [16]

Day 6 (27 May)
Schedule of play
Seeds out:
Men's Singles:  Rafael Nadal [4] (withdrew due to wrist injury),  Gilles Simon [16],  Nick Kyrgios [17],  Jack Sock [23],  Ivo Karlović [27],  Jérémy Chardy [30]
Women's Singles:  Petra Kvitová [10],  Lucie Šafářová [11],  Sloane Stephens [19],  Anastasia Pavlyuchenkova [24],  Barbora Strýcová [30]
Men's Doubles:  Jean-Julien Rojer /  Horia Tecău [2],  Henri Kontinen /  John Peers [11]
Women's Doubles:  Raquel Atawo /  Abigail Spears [8]

Day 7 (28 May)
Schedule of play
Seeds out:
Men's Singles:  Jo-Wilfried Tsonga [6],  Feliciano López [21],  Pablo Cuevas [25]
Women's Singles:  Ana Ivanovic [14],  Dominika Cibulková [22],  Kristina Mladenovic [26],  Daria Kasatkina [29]
Men's Doubles:  Vasek Pospisil /  Jack Sock [7]
Mixed Doubles:  Yaroslava Shvedova /  Florin Mergea [4]

Day 8 (29 May)
Schedule of play
Seeds out:
Men's Singles:  Kei Nishikori [5],  Milos Raonic [8],  John Isner [15],  Viktor Troicki [22]
Women's Singles:  Svetlana Kuznetsova [13],  Irina-Camelia Begu [25]
Men's Doubles:  Jamie Murray /  Bruno Soares [4],  Treat Huey /  Max Mirnyi [10],  Radek Štěpánek /  Nenad Zimonjić [12],  Daniel Nestor /  Aisam-ul-Haq Qureshi [14]
Women's Doubles:  Martina Hingis /  Sania Mirza [1],  Timea Babos /  Yaroslava Shvedova [4],  Julia Görges /  Karolína Plíšková [10],  Andreja Klepač /  Katarina Srebotnik [11]

Day 9 (30 May)
All of the scheduled matches for the day were disrupted by continuous unfriendly weather and play was cancelled (for the first time in sixteen years).
Schedule of play

Day 10 (31 May)
Only two uncompleted matches were finished due to the rain. After losing 10 games in a row with a 6–2, 3–0 lead, and eventually losing the match, to 102nd-ranked Tsvetana Pironkova, world number two Agnieszka Radwańska described herself "surprised and angry" having to play in the rain.
Schedule of play
Seeds out:
Women's Singles:  Agnieszka Radwańska [2],  Simona Halep [6]

Day 11 (1 June)
Schedule of play
Seeds out:
Men's Singles:  Richard Gasquet [9],  David Ferrer [11],  Roberto Bautista Agut [14]
Women's Singles:  Venus Williams [9],  Carla Suárez Navarro [12],  Madison Keys [15],  Elina Svitolina [18]
Men's Doubles:  Pierre-Hugues Herbert /  Nicolas Mahut [1],  Rohan Bopanna /  Florin Mergea [6],  Marcin Matkowski /  Leander Paes [16]
Women's Doubles:  Chan Hao-ching /  Chan Yung-jan [3],  Andrea Hlaváčková /  Lucie Hradecká [6],  Xu Yifan /  Zheng Saisai [9]
 Mixed Doubles:  Chan Hao-ching /  Jamie Murray [1],  Coco Vandeweghe /  Bob Bryan [8]

Day 12 (2 June)
Schedule of play
Seeds out:
Men's Singles:  Tomáš Berdych [7],  David Goffin [12]
Women's Singles:  Timea Bacsinszky [8]
 Mixed Doubles:  Kristina Mladenovic /  Pierre-Hugues Herbert [3],  Elena Vesnina /  Bruno Soares [5],  Andrea Hlaváčková /  Édouard Roger-Vasselin [6],  Chan Yung-jan /  Max Mirnyi [7]

Day 13 (3 June)
Defending champion Stan Wawrinka lost to Andy Murray in the semi-final, thus ended his 12-match winning streak in Roland Garros. Murray became the 10th male player to reach all four major finals in open era. Martina Hingis and Leander Paes won the mixed doubles title, and became just the third team to achieve a career grand slam in mixed doubles. Furthermore, Paes won a record 10th mixed doubles title in the open era, and now has only one less than the all-time record. Hingis became the fourth woman in the open era and seventh all-time to achieve a career grand slam in mixed doubles.
Schedule of play
Seeds out:
Men's Singles:  Stan Wawrinka [3],  Dominic Thiem [13]
Women's Singles:  Samantha Stosur [21]
 Men's Doubles:  Ivan Dodig /  Marcelo Melo [3],  Łukasz Kubot /  Alexander Peya [9]
 Mixed Doubles:  Sania Mirza /  Ivan Dodig [2]

Day 14 (4 June)
Garbiñe Muguruza defeated defending champion Serena Williams in straight sets in the final and won her first major. Muguruza became the first Spanish woman to win a major title since Arantxa Sánchez Vicario in 1998. The all Spanish team Feliciano Lopez and Marc Lopez defeated Bryan brothers in men's doubles finals, both won their first Grand Slam title.
Schedule of play
Seeds out:
 Women's Singles:  Serena Williams [1]
 Men's Doubles:  Bob Bryan /  Mike Bryan [5]

Day 15 (5 June)
Novak Djokovic defeated first time French Open finalist Andy Murray in four sets and he completed the career Grand Slam, making him the first male player to have all four Grand Slam titles at once in a non-calendar Grand Slam year since Rod Laver in 1969.
Schedule of play
Seeds out:
 Men's Singles:  Andy Murray [2]
 Women's Doubles:  Ekaterina Makarova /  Elena Vesnina [7]

References

Day-by-day summaries
French Open by year – Day-by-day summaries